A Very Wicked Halloween: Celebrating 15 Years on Broadway is a Halloween television special commemorating fifteen years since the premiere of the musical Wicked on Broadway. The concert special aired on NBC on October 29, 2018, and was hosted by Kristin Chenoweth and Idina Menzel, and featured performances by Ariana Grande, Adam Lambert, Ledisi and Pentatonix.

Program
The program included performances by Menzel, Chenoweth, Grande, Lambert, Ledisi, Pentatonix, the current Broadway company of the musical and others, singing many of the musical numbers from Wicked to a live studio audience at the Marquis Theatre in New York. The concert special was directed by Glenn Weiss.

"One Short Day" – Broadway cast of Wicked
"As Long as You're Mine" – Ledisi and Adam Lambert
"Popular" – Kristin Chenoweth
"What Is This Feeling?" – Pentatonix
"Defying Gravity" – Idina Menzel
"The Wizard and I" – Ariana Grande
"For Good" – Chenoweth and Menzel, joined by several other Glindas/Elphabas from the history of the show.

References

External links
 

2010s American television specials
2018 in New York City
2018 television specials
Halloween television specials
NBC television specials
Television shows directed by Glenn Weiss
The Wicked Years
Tribute concerts in the United States